Ciechania  (Tykhania) is a village in the administrative district of Gmina Krempna, within Jasło County, Subcarpathian Voivodeship, in south-eastern Poland, close to the border with Slovakia.

The village was founded by the Stadnicki family in the 16th century. At the end of the World War II it was a strong defensive outpost of the German forces. During the Battle of the Dukla Pass it was destroyed. Up to 2006 there was a picturesque tourist track through the Ciechania valley which was closed by the authorities of the Magura National Park.

References

Ciechania